Sorhagenia daedala is a moth in the family Cosmopterigidae. It was described by Ronald W. Hodges in 1964. It is found in North America, where it has been recorded from California.

References

Moths described in 1964
Chrysopeleiinae